Henrik Holm (born 22 August 1968) is a former professional tennis player from Sweden, who turned professional in 1988. The right-hander won five doubles titles, reached the quarterfinals of the 1992 Stockholm Masters and achieved a career-high ATP singles ranking of world No. 17 in July 1993.

Career
Holm started playing tennis at the age of five. His father, Christer, played Davis Cup for Sweden and was ranked No. 2 in his country during the mid 1960s. His mother, Gun, is a tennis coach.
In July 1992 Holm reached his first career Tour singles final in Washington, losing to Petr Korda. Later that year he reached the final at the Tokyo Indoor, losing to Ivan Lendl. In the third round of that tournament he handed Boris Becker his worst career indoor loss (6–1, 6–2).

ATP career finals

Singles: 2 (2 runner-ups)

Doubles: 9 (5 titles, 4 runner-ups)

ATP Challenger and ITF Futures finals

Singles: 9 (6–3)

Doubles: 11 (7–4)

Performance timelines

Singles

Doubles

References

External links
 
 
 

1968 births
Living people
Swedish male tennis players
People from Täby Municipality
Sportspeople from Stockholm County
20th-century Swedish people